A laser is a device which generates a coherent beam of light.

Laser may also refer to:

Transportation
 Laser (dinghy), a class of small sailing boat
 Ford Laser, a compact car sold mainly in Asia Pacific markets from 1980 to 2003
 Chrysler Laser, a hatchback car sold from 1985 to 1986
 Plymouth Laser, a sports coupe sold from 1989 to 1994
 LASER Airlines, an airline based in Venezuela

Computing
 MPEG-4 Part 20, a rich media standard (LASeR – Lightweight Application Scene Representation)
 VTech Laser 200, an 8-bit home computer family
 Laser 128, a clone of the Apple II home computer

People
 Christine Laser (born 1951), German athlete
 Dieter Laser (1942–2020), German actor

Other uses
 Lasers (album), by Lupe Fiasco
 Laser (debit card), a former Irish debit card scheme
 Laser (plant), a plant genus of the family Apiaceae
 Laser (malt liquor), a brand of malt liquor
 Laser (roller coaster), a German portable roller coaster
 David Copperfield's laser illusion (known as "The Laser")
 Longeau, Belgium, a village of Wallonia
 Leonardo Art Science Evening Rendezvous, a lecture series
 Silphium (antiquity), an extinct plant which produced the resin laser

See also
 Atom laser
 
 Lazar (disambiguation)
 Lazer (disambiguation)